The Underground is the 17th book in the Animorphs series, written by K.A. Applegate. It is narrated by Rachel.

Plot summary
The Animorphs save a man named George Edelman from jumping out of a building. They later hear that he has been committed to an asylum for talking about aliens living in his head. They bust in to talk to him, and he reveals that some Yeerks have discovered a way to survive without the Kandrona: eating Instant Maple and Ginger Oatmeal. However, the oatmeal is extremely addictive to the Yeerk, who goes insane and never leaves the host body. The Animorphs decide to use this information to hurt the Yeerks by dumping oatmeal into the Yeerk Pool.

They attempt to morph flies and follow a controller into the pool, but find that the Yeerks have installed "Gleet Bio-Filters" on all Yeerk Pool entrances which destroy any unauthorized life forms that attempt to enter. They decide instead to morph moles and dig their way in. On the way through their tunnel, they find a bat cave. They morph bats and fly into the Yeerk Pool, but are attacked by hunter robots. Ax, Jake and Tobias are captured, and Rachel falls into the pool. She morphs an ant, gets out, steals a Dracon beam, and disguises herself as a human-Controller. After overhearing that there is a stash of the oatmeal near the pool confiscated from addicted human-controllers, she finds Cassie and Marco just as Visser Three arrives to receive the captured "Andalite bandits." Rachel throws a barrel full of oatmeal into the pool and threatens to burst it open with the Dracon beam unless the others are released. Visser Three is about to allow the Yeerks in the pool to be sacrificed in order to capture the "Andalite Bandits", so Rachel tosses him in as well. They begin to escape with the others, but as they are escaping the Visser begins morphing, so Marco shoots open the barrels of oatmeal. Rachel uses the Dracon beam to collapse the tunnel on them, and they dig to the surface as moles.

The book ends as Rachel's mom reports that George Edelman escaped from the asylum with the help of a psychic grizzly bear.

Morphs

Television series

This book wound up being the basis for the episode "The Escape" in the Animorphs TV series. like the other episodes surrounding it, there are quite a number of changes:

 In the book, Rachel and the others find Mr. Edelman at the opening of Planet Hollywood. In the TV series, while they are discussing sneaking into Planet Hollywood, the incident where they meet Mr. Edelman involves them at a diner and Mr. Edelman going crazy over needing more oatmeal.
 In the book, Rachel is the only one to visit Mr. Edelman in the hospital. In the TV series, Marco also joins Rachel in speaking to him (they disguise themselves as doctors).
 In the books, they morph a mole to dig underground. In the TV series, they morph into ferrets and dig underground.
 In the book, Rachel finds three barrels of oatmeal in the Yeerk Pool complex. In the TV series, they create oatmeal "waterbombs" and throw them in the pool and at various Controllers, including Visser Three (this is how they get the oatmeal underground).
 Due to potential copyright issues, the location they visit in the TV series is changed to a generic diner, as opposed to a McDonald's in the books.

Animorphs books
1998 American novels
1998 science fiction novels
Chemical war and weapons in popular culture